Pseudonocardia yuanmonensis is a bacterium from the genus of Pseudonocardia which has been isolated from forest soil in Yuanmo County, Yunnan Province, China.

References

Pseudonocardia
Bacteria described in 2012